Fajardo is a city in Puerto Rico.

Fajardo may also refer to:

Places
Fajardo metropolitan area, Puerto Rico
Fajardo River, Puerto Rico
Víctor Fajardo Province, Peru

People
Fajardo (surname), list of people with the surname

Sports
 Fajardo FC, Puerto Rico
 Fajardo Cariduros, Puerto Rico